Navdeep Singh Bains  (born June 16, 1977) is a Canadian politician who served as Minister of Innovation, Science and Industry from 2015 to 2021. A member of the Liberal Party, he represented the riding of Mississauga—Malton in the House of Commons from 2015 to 2021. He previously represented the riding of Mississauga—Brampton South from 2004 to 2011.

As Minister of Innovation, Science and Industry, he held responsibility for R&D, science and innovation policy. After retiring from politics, Bains joined CIBC as Vice-Chair, Global Investment Banking in September 2021.

Early life and career
Bains was born in Toronto, Ontario on June 16, 1977, to Indian parents, Harminder and Balwinder Bains.

Bains graduated from Turner Fenton Secondary School in Brampton, while it was known as J. A. Turner Secondary School and Turner Fenton Campus. After completing high school, Bains attended York University, where he received his Bachelor of Management Studies.  He then went on to finish his Masters in Business Administration from the University of Windsor. He received his Certified Management Accountant designation, subsequently becoming a Chartered Professional Accountant in 2014. In 2016, he was awarded the prestigious FCPA designation by CPA Ontario for his "outstanding achievements including community leadership".

Bains worked as a financial processing analyst at Nike Canada from 2000 to 2001. He also worked for the Ford Motor Company as a revenue and costing analyst from 2000 until 2004.

Political career

38th Parliament
In his first election in 2004, Bains won the Liberal nomination for the riding of Mississauga—Brampton South, and won the seat with over 57% of the total vote; beating his next nearest opponent by over 33%, or over 14,000 votes. At that time, Bains was 26 years old and the youngest Liberal MP in Parliament.

Bains was elected chair of the Subcommittee on Human Rights and International Development of the Standing Committee on Foreign Affairs and International Trade in April 2005, and held it until October 7, 2005, when he became parliamentary secretary to the prime minister, which at the time was Paul Martin. As parliamentary secretary to the prime minister, Bains was sworn in as a member of the Privy Council, and served until February 5, 2006, the day before the Conservative government of Stephen Harper was sworn in after the 2006 federal election.

In October 2005, Bains also became a member of the Red Ribbon Task Force that released a 2006 report on revitalizing the party organization.

In opposition
In 2006, Bains was re-elected in his riding with just under 54% of the vote.

Also in 2006, Bains co-chaired the Liberal Party of Canada (Ontario)'s annual general meeting Toronto. Because of his position in the Party and the roles he has been given, Bains was seen as a rising star, and had been selected three years in a row in the Hill Times survey as the best up and comer.

During the 2006 Liberal leadership convention to replace Paul Martin, Bains threw his support behind Ontario Education Minister Gerard Kennedy, and after Kennedy dropped out before the third ballot, he joined Kennedy in supporting the eventual winner and new party leader, Stéphane Dion.

In the 39th Parliament, Bains held Official Opposition critic portfolios for Public Works and Government Services, the Treasury Board and International Trade, respectively. Bains was also member of the Liberal Caucus Committees for Planning and Priorities, Canada and the World and Economic Prosperity. In January 2007, he was appointed to the National Election Readiness Committee as a Caucus Representative and in March 2007 served as the Youth Liaison to the Young Liberals of Canada.

In January 2009, he was selected by Michael Ignatieff along with Steve MacKinnon to serve as Co-Chairs of the Special Committee on Party Renewal and tasked with heading a consultation process with the party membership on how to strengthen the party. In March 2009, Bains was appointed Chair of Platform Development and oversaw the creation of the party's next electoral platform. As part of his recommendations for party renewal, delegates at the 2009 Liberal leadership election voted to ensure that all future leadership elections would be under a "weighted one member, one vote" system, where each riding has 100 points that are distributed to leadership candidates based on the percentage of votes from party members in that riding.

During the 40th Parliament, Bains held Official Opposition critic portfolios for Natural Resources and Small Business and Tourism.

In January 2011, Bains claimed that the Bloc Québécois was using "the politics of fear" and argued against their attempt to ban the ceremonial Sikh kirpan from the parliamentary buildings after an incident in which the Quebec National Assembly denied entry to a group of four kirpan-wearing Sikhs.

Out of Parliament
In the 2011 federal election, Eve Adams, a former Mississauga City Councillor, beat Bains by over 5,000 votes.

Bains was a director of the Municipal Property Assessment Corporation from September 2012 to September 2015. He also served on the Ontario Provincial Board of the Heart and Stroke Foundation, including a stint as Vice Chair starting December 2014. Bains is also on the board of advisors for the Pearson Centre for Progressive Policy.

Bains also entered academia and became an adjunct lecturer in a Master of Public Service program at the University of Waterloo and a distinguished visiting professor at the Ted Rogers School of Management at Ryerson University, starting in 2013 for a one-year term. His teaching contract at Ryerson was extended, and he was still a professor at the time of his re-election in 2015.

Bains was touted as a possible candidate in the 2014 municipal election in Brampton and was included in January 2014 polling alongside candidates like Susan Fennell and John Sanderson in which he finished third among voters polled. Provincial Liberal Linda Jeffrey subsequently ran for mayor and won.

Minister of Innovation, Science and Industry

Bains was the Ontario co-chair for the federal Liberal campaign, and was returned to the House of Commons in the 2015 federal election in the new riding of Mississauga—Malton. On November 4, 2015, he was appointed the minister of innovation, science and economic development in Justin Trudeau's Cabinet. The next day, Bains announced that the mandatory long form census would be restored for 2016, after it was removed from the 2011 edition under the Harper government. Under Bains’ leadership, the 2016 Census response rate exceeded 98 percent, making it the most successful Census since 1666.

A major focus of Bains’ mandate is to spur innovation and economic development in Canada. Following public consultations across Canada in the summer of 2016, he launched the Inclusive Innovation Agenda. Based on the consultations, the Bains identified three priority areas for Canada's Innovation Agenda: finding better ways for more Canadians to get the skills the global economy demands (People), harnessing emerging tech that would create industries and jobs that never existed before as well as reinvigorate existing ones (Technology), and encouraging more Canadians to start and grow companies that are competitive in the global economy (Companies).

His portfolio also includes responsibility for the six regional development agencies across Canada: Atlantic Canada Opportunities Agency (ACOA); Canada Economic Development for Quebec Regions (CED); Canadian Northern Economic Development Agency (CanNor); Federal Economic Development Agency for Southern Ontario (FedDev Ontario); Federal Economic Development Initiative for Northern Ontario (FedNor); Western Economic Diversification Canada (WD).

In December 2016, he also launched Connect to Innovate, a program that will invest $500 million to bring high-speed Internet to rural and remote communities across Canada. In 2018, Bains announced $950 million for a variety of national superclusters of innovation across the country. To date, Minister Bains has supported 37 projects, investing $389 million, leading to nearly $4.1 billion in total investments in the automotive sector. Bains locked in the manufacturing of the C-Series in Montréal, protecting 6,000 direct jobs in Ontario and Québec in the aerospace industry. He also launched Canada's first-ever Intellectual Property Strategy.

Bains worked closely with the Advisory Council on Economic Growth, which advised the minister of finance on economic policies to achieve long-term sustainable growth. The council called for a gradual increase in permanent immigration to Canada to 450,000 people a year.

In 2019, Minister Bains announced Canada's Digital Charter.

In August 2020, amidst a review of an August 2019 decision by the Canadian Radio-television and Telecommunications Commission (CRTC) to reduce capacity rates by up to 43% and access rates up to 77%, Bains released a statement saying that the government shared the fears of Canada's big telecommunication corporations that it went too far and would disincentivize investment in communication networks, especially less profitable rural and remote areas. However, the statement also said that the government would not formally intervene in the ongoing review.

COVID-19 
In August 2020, Bains and Minister of Public Services and Procurement Anita Anand, announced major steps towards securing COVID-19 vaccine and therapies. Bains also announced the members of the COVID-19 Therapeutics Task Force and COVID-19 Vaccine Task Force (VTF). Nancy Harrison and Cédric Bisson are co-chairs of the Therapeutics Task Force (TTF) tasked with prioritizing "financial support for promising COVID-19 treatment projects." The secretariat of the Therapeutics Task Force is housed at Bains' ISEDC department. Joanne Langley and J. Mark Lievonen are the co-chairs Vaccine Task Force advising the federal government on "vaccine development, related bio-manufacturing and international partnerships". The secretariat of the Vaccine Task force is supported by the National Research Council of Canada. Potential members of the Joint Biomanufacturing Subcommittee of the COVID‐19 Vaccine Task Force and Therapeutics Task Force Meeting began meeting on June 22, 2020, to examine initial proposals from Laval, Quebec-based-Biodextris, Calgary, Alberta-based-Providence Therapeutics, Edmonton, Alberta-based-Entos Pharmaceuticals, Montréal-based Glycovax Pharma, Vancouver-based-Precision Nanosystems, Vancouver-based Symvivo Incorporated, Dartmouth, Nova Scotia-based IMV, Quebec City-based Medicago Inc., and Maryland-based Novavax. On June 25 they began their reviews of proposals submitted by AstraZeneca, Pfizer, Variation Biotechnologies (VBI). On July 3 they reviewed Moderna's proposal. Later in July they reviewed Novavax and Johnson & Johnson, and in September Sanofi / GSK. The first announcements of approvals began on August 5 for Pfizer and Moderna and the most of the approvals were announced in October 2020.

Legislation
Bains introduced legislation to amend the Copyright Act with respect to improving access to works by persons with a perceptual disability, which subsequently received Royal Assent in June 2016, thus enabling Canada to become the key 20th nation to accede to the Marrakesh Treaty, bringing the Treaty into force on September 30, 2016. He also put forward bill C-25, proposing to amend federal corporate law to promote corporate transparency and increase diversity on corporate boards. In particular, the bill focuses on the participation of women on corporate boards, as well as on senior management teams. In the same Parliamentary session, Bains introduced bill C-36, intended to enhance, reinforce and protect the independence of Statistics Canada, fulfilling a campaign promise from the Liberals 2015 election platform. In June 2018, both bills C-25 and C-36 received Royal Assent.

Personal life
Bains currently resides in Peel with his wife, Brahamjot, with whom he has two daughters

Recognition 
The Hill Times featured Bains on the cover of their Power & Influence magazine in 2017. Dubbed the ‘Minister of Everything’ in the article, he was ranked 4th most influential, behind Justin Trudeau, Katie Telford and Gerald Butts. On April 7, 2017, CFIB's Executive Vice-President and Chief Strategic Officer Laura Jones presented Bains with a Golden Scissors Award" as a symbolic gesture of cutting through red tape shortly after Bains announced the interprovincial legislation entitled the Canadian Free Trade Agreement (CFTA). He is a recipient of Startup Canada's Policy Prize (2017). In 2017, Bains was listed in The Globe and Mail's The Power 50. He is featured as the second influencer on the 2018 Bay Street Bull Power 50 list, and Apolitical listed him among the World's 100 Most Influential People in Digital Government.

Electoral results

References

External links
Official website
Bio & mandate from the Prime Minister

1977 births
Canadian accountants
Canadian people of Indian descent
Canadian people of Punjabi descent
Canadian Sikhs
Canadian politicians of Indian descent
Canadian politicians of Punjabi descent
Liberal Party of Canada MPs
Living people
Members of the House of Commons of Canada from Ontario
Members of the King's Privy Council for Canada
Politicians from Mississauga
Politicians from Toronto
Punjabi people
University of Windsor alumni
York University alumni
Members of the 29th Canadian Ministry